IGRhCellID is a database of cell lines using some common tools to reduce cell lines misidentification.

See also
 Cell line

References

External links
 http://igrcid.ibms.sinica.edu.tw

Biological databases
Cell culture